Major General Steven A. Cray (born June 15, 1964) was the Adjutant General of Vermont.  In this post he served as the senior uniformed officer in the state, and was responsible for the organization, training and equipping of the 4,000 members of the Vermont Army and Air National Guard. As adjutant general, he also served as inspector general, quartermaster general and head of the State Military Department, including the Vermont State Guard and Veterans Affairs.

Early life
Steven A. Cray was born in Burlington, Vermont, on June 15, 1964.  He graduated from the University of Vermont (UVM) in 1989 with a Bachelor of Science degree in business.

Military career
General Cray enlisted in the Vermont Air National Guard while a student at UVM. He received his commission as a second lieutenant after graduating from the Academy of Military Science in 1984.

He became a pilot and attained the rating of command pilot, logging over 2,500 hours of military flying, mostly in the F-16.  He is a qualified Joint Task Force Commander and held a variety of command, supervisory and staff positions in the 158th Fighter Wing and Vermont Joint Force Headquarters.  Prior to his appointment as adjutant general he served as assistant adjutant general for air.

Election as adjutant general
In 2012 Michael Dubie left the adjutant general's position to become deputy commander of United States Northern Command.  He was succeeded on an interim basis by Thomas E. Drew.

In February, 2013 Cray defeated three other candidates in the Vermont General Assembly election for the position.  In Vermont, the adjutant general is elected for a two-year term in secret balloting by a combined meeting of the Vermont House of Representatives and Vermont State Senate in February of each odd-numbered year.

Cray was promoted to major general and took over from Drew in a ceremony on March 1, 2013, and Drew retired.

Reelection as adjutant general
On February 19, 2015, the Vermont General Assembly reelected Cray to a two-year term.  He was unopposed, and won by unanimous voice vote.  In February 2017, Cray was re-elected to another two-year term, again by unanimous voice vote. He did not run for re-election in 2019.  Cray was presented with the Air Force Distinguished Service Medal at his March 2019 retirement ceremony.  He was succeeded by Brigadier General Gregory C. Knight.

Civilian career
Before becoming adjutant general, General Cray was employed as a commercial airline pilot with American Airlines, and logged over 10,000 flight hours.  He also served as president of the Vermont National Guard Charitable Foundation and on other civic and charitable boards and commissions.

Education
 1989 University of Vermont, Bachelor of Science, Agriculture, Burlington, Vermont
 1997 Air Command and Staff College, by correspondence
 2003 Air War College, by correspondence
 2007 Advanced Joint Professional Military Education, Joint Forces Staff College, Norfolk, Virginia
 2007 Dual Status Title 10/32 Joint Task Force Commander's Course, Peterson Air Force Base, Colorado
 2008 Senior Leaders Orientation Course
 2010 Joint Force Air Component Commander's Course (JFACC), by correspondence
 2011 Capstone Military Leadership Program
 2012 Joint Senior Reserve Officer Course (JSROC)
 2015 Harvard University, General and Flag Officer Homeland Security Executive Seminar
 2017 Advanced Senior Leader Development Program-Strategic Engagement Seminar (ASLDP-SES)

Assignments
 January 1985 – February 1986, student, Undergraduate Pilot Training, Williams Air Force Base, Arizona
 March 1986 – April 1986, student, AT-38, Fighter Lead-In Training, Holloman Air Force Base, New Mexico
 April 1986 – November 1986, student, F-16 Replacement Training Unit, MacDill Air Force Base, Florida 
 November 1986 – January 1989, assistant standards and evaluation officer, F-16, 134th Fighter Squadron, Burlington, Vermont
 January 1989 – July 1992, safety officer/flight lead, F-16, 134th Fighter Squadron, Burlington, Vermont
 July 1992 – April 1994, instructor pilot, F-16, 134th Fighter Squadron, Burlington, Vermont
 April 1994 – August 1997, supervisor of flying/flight commander F-16, 134th Fighter Squadron, Burlington, Vermont
 August 1997 – September 2002, standards and evaluation flight examiner, 134th Fighter Squadron, Burlington, Vermont
 September 2002 – May 2004, director of operations, Joint Force Headquarters, Vermont Air National Guard, Colchester, Vermont
 May 2004 – May 2006, director of plans and programs, Joint Force Headquarters, Vermont Air National Guard, Colchester, Vermont
 May 2006 – April 2009, chief of staff, Joint Force Headquarters, Vermont Air National Guard, Colchester, Vermont
 April 2009 – March 2013, assistant adjutant general-air, Vermont National Guard, Joint Force Headquarters, Vermont Air National Guard, Colchester, Vermont
 March 2013 – March 2019, adjutant general, Vermont National Guard, Joint Force Headquarters, Colchester, Vermont

Flight information
General Cray holds the rating of Command Pilot.   He has flown more than 2,500 hours.  The aircraft he has flown include the F-16A/B/C/D, AT-38, T-38, and T-37.

Awards and decorations

Effective dates of promotions

References

1964 births
Living people
National Guard (United States) generals
United States Air Force generals
Vermont National Guard personnel
Recipients of the Legion of Merit
Recipients of the Air Force Distinguished Service Medal
Aviators from Vermont
Commercial aviators
University of Vermont alumni
Air War College alumni
People from Burlington, Vermont